Potok is a small village in the Municipality of Kamnik in the Upper Carniola region of Slovenia.  It lies on the Nevljica River in the Tuhinj Valley.

Name
The name of the settlement literally means 'creek, stream'. Snovišek Creek, a tributary of the Nevljica River, flows through the village.

References

External links

Potok on Geopedia

Populated places in the Municipality of Kamnik